Movement for Modern and Active Krajina (abbreviated POMAK) is a political party in Bosnia and Herzegovina founded by Šuhret Fazlić, mayor of Bihać, in 2018. It aims to improve the economy, healthcare and education, and improve the political strength of the Bosanska Krajina and Una-Sana Canton as a whole, which it feels has been neglected by the government since Bosnia and Herzegovina's independence in the 1990s.

In the 2022 Federation of Bosnia and Herzegovina general election, POMAK won 3 seats on the Assembly of Una-Sana Canton and one seat in the House of Representatives of the Federation of Bosnia and Herzegovina: Maja Uremović in the 1st Electoral Unit.

Electoral history

Parliamentary elections

References

Bosniak political parties in Bosnia and Herzegovina
Political parties established in 2018
Political parties in Bosnia and Herzegovina